Nasik Road Railway Station or Nashik Road Railway Station serves Nashik city, Nashik Road and surrounding areas in Nashik district in the Indian state of Maharashtra. It is main railway station of Nashik. It is one of the oldest and busiest railway station in India. It is located on Mumbai–Delhi, Mumbai–Kolkata main line. It is A1 category railway station. It comes under Bhusawal Division of Central Railway. Nearly 300 trains have stops at this railway station. Approximately 0 people travel daily from this railway station. It is one of the cleanest railway station in India.

History
The line was extended to Khandwa in 1866 and to Nagpur in 1867.

Electrification
The railways in the Igatpuri–Manmad section were electrified in 1967–69.

Amenities
Amenities at Nasik Road railway station include: tourist information centre, computerized reservation office, waiting room, retiring room, light refreshments,  book stall, lift and escalator.

Nasik Road railway station is located at a distance of 9 km from Nashik city centre. Taxis, auto & city buses are available at the railway station for travel to different parts of the city and outside.

Busy station
Nasik Road railway station is amongst the top hundred booking stations of Indian Railway.

Awards
Nasik Road station has been awarded as 6th cleanest railway station in A1/A category in India by Indian Railway (As per 2021 and 2022).

Gallery

Trains that halt here 

 Panchvati Express
 Hazur Sahib Nanded–Mumbai CST Rajya Rani Express
 Sewagram Express
 Godavari Superfast Express
 Vidarbha Express
 Devagiri Express
 Tapovan Express
 Gitanjali Express
 Howrah–Mumbai Mail
 Pushpak Express
 Punjab Mail
 Lokmanya Tilak Terminus–Jaynagar Pawan Express
 Udyognagri Express
 Lokmanya Tilak Terminus–Kamakhya AC Express
 Godaan Express
 CSMT Mumbai Jalna Jan Shatabdi Express
 Rajendra Nagar–Lokmanya Tilak Terminus Janta Express
 Kamayani Express
 Mahanagari Express
 Nandigram Express
 Lokmanya Tilak Terminus–Guwahati Express
 Saket Express
 Ranchi–Lokmanya Tilak Terminus Express
 Lokmanya Tilak Terminus–Patliputra Express
 Kushinagar Express
 Mangala Lakshadweep Express
 Vasco–Patna Express
 Howrah–Mumbai Superfast Express
 Mumbai CSMT–Hazrat Nizamuddin Rajdhani Express
 Lokmanya Tilak Terminus–Hazrat Nizamuddin AC Express
 Visakhapatnam–Lokmanya Tilak Terminus Express
 Pune   Bhusawal Express

References

External links
 Departures from Nasik Road
 

Railway stations in Nashik district
Bhusawal railway division
Railway stations opened in 1866
Transport in Nashik
Buildings and structures in Nashik
1866 establishments in India